Events from the 1510s in Denmark.

Incumbents
 Monarch — John (until 20 February 1513), Christian II
 Steward of the Realm — Niels Eriksen Rosenkrantz (1513–1515)

Events
1510

 10 August – Establishment of the Dano-Norwegian navy.

1512

 23 April – the Treaty of Malmö is signed, ending the Dano-Swedish War of 1501–1512.

1514
 11 June – Coronation of King Christian II.

Births
1511
 Birgitte Gøye, county administrator, lady in waiting, landholder and noble (died 1574)
1513

 Niels Hemmingsen, Lutheran theologian (died 1600)

1515

 Jørgen Lykke, nobleman and politician (died 1583)
 Jørgen Thygesen Brahe, nobleman (died 1565)

1517
 Trials and execution of Torben Oxe.

1518

 21 February – John of Denmark, eldest child of Christian II and Isabella of Austria (died 1532 in Germany)

Deaths

1511

 1 April – Francis of Denmark, youngest son of King John of Denmark and Christina of Saxony (born 1497)

1512

 Edele Jernskjæg, royal mistress of King John I of Denmark.

1513
 20 February – John, King of Denmark (born 1455)
1517
 21 September – Dyveke Sigbritsdatter, royal mistress (born 1490)
 29 November – Torben Oxe, noble, landowner

References

 
Years of the 16th century in Denmark